The  is a transportation company in Kanazawa, Japan. The company was founded in 1943, when all the private railway and bus operators in Ishikawa Prefecture were merged into one. Some of its lines, however, have their roots from horse car lines in the 19th century. Hokutetsu once had an extensive railway network in the prefecture with 13 heavy rail lines and 1 tram line, but only 2 heavy rail lines still survive today. Now the company primary functions as a bus operator. It also operates as the agency of All Nippon Airways in Kanazawa area.

Its lines accept ICa, a smart card ticketing system. However, the railway lines only accept the commuter passes, not the prepaid cards.

Railway lines

Currently operational
■ Asanogawa Line (浅野川線): Hokutetsu-Kanazawa — Uchinada
■ Ishikawa Line (石川線): Nomachi — Tsurugi

Discontinued
Including the discontinued sections of current lines.
Asanogawa Line (浅野川線): Uchinada — Awagasaki-Kaigan
Ishikawa Line (石川線): Shiragikuchō — Nomachi
Kanaiwa Line (金石線): Nakabashi — Ōno-Minato, Matsubara — Tōtōen
Kinmei Line (金名線): Kaga-Ichinomiya — Hakusan-Shita
Komatsu Line (小松線): Komatsu — Ukawa-Yūsenji
Nomi Line (能美線): Shin-Terai — Tsurugi
Noto Line (能登線): Hakui — Sanmyō
Shōkin Line (松金線): Mattō — Nomachi
Kanan Line (加南線)
Awazu Line (粟津線): Awazu-Onsen — Shin-Awazu
Iburihashi Line (動橋線): Uwano — Shin-Iburihashi.
Later merged with Link Line as Yamashiro Line (山代線).
Katayamazu Line (片山津線): Iburihashi — Katayamazu
Link Line (連絡線): Kanan — Awazu-Onsen.
Later merged with Iburihashi Line as Yamashiro Line.
Yamanaka Line (山中線): Yamanaka — Daishōji
Kanazawa City Tram Line (金沢市内軌道線)

Bus Lines

Together with its subsidiaries, the Hokutetsu group dominates the bus lines in Ishikawa Prefecture. Hokuriku Railroad itself operates local buses inside Kanazawa City, which is the most important public transportation in the area. The company also operates highway buses linking the city and other parts of Japan, including Tokyo, Sendai, Niigata, Nagoya, Ōsaka, and Toyama.

See also
List of railway companies in Japan

External links 
  Official website

Meitetsu Group
Railway companies established in 1943